Punk Goes Pop Volume 4 is the twelfth compilation album in the Punk Goes... series created by Fearless Records and the fourth installment in the Punk Goes Pop franchise to feature bands covering mainstream pop music. It was released on November 21, 2011 through Fearless Records. On September 22, 2011, MTV Buzzworthy announced the album's full track list. The album also included a second bonus sampler CD containing songs by bands from Fearless' record label.

Punk Goes Pop Volume 4 spawned three singles: Pierce the Veil's cover of "Just the Way You Are", Woe, Is Me's cover of "Last Friday Night (T.G.I.F.)", and Go Radio's cover of "Rolling in the Deep".

The album debuted at number 92 on the Billboard 200.

Additionally Japan's edition of the album contains three extra bonus tracks by Japanese bands covering pop songs.

Track listing

Japanese Edition
The Japanese version contains the following three bonus tracks.

Sampler Track listing
Punk Goes Pop Volume 4 also included a bonus sampler CD containing 8 previous released songs by bands from the Fearless Record label.

References

Covers albums
Punk Goes series
2011 compilation albums